LaToya M. Hobbs (born and raised in Little Rock, Arkansas) is an American painter and printmaker best known for her large-scale portraits of black women. Hobbs moved to Baltimore, MD later in her life where she works as a professor at the Maryland Institute College of Art. She gained recognition for her portraiture and figurative imagery in the 2010s, receiving several travel grants and awards in the late twenty teens. Her work addresses the ideas of black beauty and cultural identity that center around being a woman.

Early life and education 
LaToya M. Hobbs spent most of her early life in Little Rock, Arkansas until after she graduated from college. In her church during her youth she sang in choir and performed liturgical dance.  Hobbs studied biology at the University of Arkansas until she realized that painting was her true calling. At that time she switched paths and schools to study studio art. Hobbs graduated from the University of Arkansas at Little Rock with a BA in painting. She later received her MFA in studio art: painting and printmaking from Purdue University. After her education Hobbs moved to Maryland.

Career 
Hobbs works as a full-time professor at MICA (Maryland Institute College of Art). She paints and creates her work in her home studio. In 2019, she had a solo exhibition titled Salt of the Earth II at Baltimore City Hall. Her work was also showcased in From Baltimore, With Love, a group exhibition with Mary Deacon Opasik, Oletha deVane, Jessica Devilbliss at Brentwood Arts Exchange, Brentwood, MD in 2019, curated by Schroeder Cherry. She gained recognition in 2020 as a finalist and then winner of the Janet & Walter Sondheim Artscape Prize given in Baltimore, MD which comes with a $25,000 prize. In 2021, Hobbs was featured with Mequitta Ahuja, Lauren Frances Adams, and Cindy Cheng in the exhibition "All Due Respect" at the Baltimore Museum of Art. The exhibition features five, fifteen foot long each scenes carved from wood titled "Carving Out Time."

Work 
Performance art was a strong influence in Hobbs' early life. Elizabeth Catlett had a strong influence on Hobbs. Hobbs is best known for her portraiture, which has a characteristic appearance. Her prints and paintings typically feature texture, color, and bold patterns.

Personal life 
Hobbs is married and has two children.

Selected solos exhibitions 
 Salt of the Earth II, Baltimore City Hall Galleries, Baltimore, MD, 2019 
 Salt of the Earth, Community Folk Arts Center, Syracuse University, Syracuse, NY, 2018 
 Sitting Pretty, Rosenberg Gallery, Goucher College, Towson, MD, 2018
 Beautiful Uprising, University of Wisconsin-Marinette, Marinette, WI, 2016
 Oshun: LaToya M. Hobbs, African American Museum, Dallas, TX, 2015 
 Beautiful Uprising, Patty and Rusty Rueff Galleries, Purdue University, West Lafayette, IN, 2013 
 Beautiful Uprising, Hearne Fine Art, Little Rock, AK, 2013 
 Recent Work by LaToya M. Hobbs, University Plaza, West Lafayette, IN, 2012 
 Duafe, Purdue University Black Cultural Center, West Lafayette, IN, 2011  
 Beauty and Identity, Mullins Library Gallery University of Arkansas, Fayetteville, AK, 2011 
 Women of Color, Spectrum Gallery, Lafayette, IN, 2011

References

External links 
 

Living people
Artists from Little Rock, Arkansas
African-American painters
African-American printmakers
American women painters
Year of birth missing (living people)
American women printmakers
21st-century American painters
21st-century American printmakers
African-American women artists
University of Arkansas alumni
Purdue University alumni
Maryland Institute College of Art faculty
American women academics
21st-century American women artists
21st-century African-American women